The Hialeah Seaboard Air Line Railway Station is a historic Seaboard Air Line Railroad depot in Hialeah, Florida. It is located at 1200 Southeast 10th Court.

Built in 1926, the station is essentially identical to the Naples Seaboard station on the southwest coast of Florida. Architects Harvey and Clarke, who also designed many other Seaboard Air Line stations of the period, designed the Mediterranean Revival station. It was served by, among other Seaboard trains, the Orange Blossom Special until 1953, and the Silver Meteor beginning in 1939.  Passenger service to the station ended in 1972. On July 14, 1995, the station was added to the U.S. National Register of Historic Places.

In 1989, the South Florida Regional Transportation Authority began Tri-Rail commuter rail service to the station, adding a bus shelter style structure immediately to the south, which it calls the Hialeah Market station.

Gallery

References

External links
 Miami-Dade County listings at National Register of Historic Places
 Florida's Office of Cultural and Historical Programs
 Miami-Dade County listings
 Hialeah Seaboard Airline Railway Station

Railway stations on the National Register of Historic Places in Florida
National Register of Historic Places in Miami-Dade County, Florida
Former railway stations in Florida
H
1926 establishments in Florida
Transportation buildings and structures in Miami-Dade County, Florida
Mediterranean Revival architecture in Florida